Martin Ness was a male international table tennis player from Germany.

He won a silver medal at the 1969 World Table Tennis Championships in the Swaythling Cup (men's team event) with Wilfried Lieck, Bernt Jansen and Eberhard Schöler for West Germany.

See also
 List of table tennis players
 List of World Table Tennis Championships medalists

References

German male table tennis players
1942 births
1987 deaths
World Table Tennis Championships medalists
Sportspeople from Augsburg